Live in France may refer to:

Live in France, album by Soft Machine
Live in France (Rodrigo y Gabriela album)
Live in France, by P.J. Harvey 2004